The Caergwrle Bowl is a unique object dating to the Middle Bronze Age, c. 1300 BC, originally manufactured from shale, tin and gold, and found in Caergwrle, Wales. It is thought to represent a boat, with its applied gold decoration signifying oars and waves, and either sun discs or circular shields.

Some researchers have suggested that the Caergwrle Bowl represents a mythological solar boat. Similarities have been noted with the contemporary miniature gold boats from Nors in Denmark, and with the later Broighter gold boat from Ireland. The Caergwrle bowl has also been related to the earlier Nebra sky disc from Germany, which is thought to depict a solar boat. Gold lunulae from the Early Bronze Age Beaker culture, including examples from Wales, have also been interpreted as representations of solar boats. The gold cape from Mold, which dates from the same period as the Nebra sky disc, was found near to Caergwrle. In Ancient Greek poetry and art the Sun's vessel is depicted as a gold bowl or cup.

The incomplete bowl was found in 1823 by a workman digging a drain in a field below Caergwrle Castle. It was donated to the National Museum Wales in 1912, and sent to the British Museum for restoration where it was originally reconstructed from wax with the decoration attached by an adhesive. Since then the bowl has been rebuilt again as the first conservation failed to be stable.

References

Bronze Age cultures of Europe
Bronze Age Wales
Collections of Amgueddfa Cymru – Museum Wales